The 1917 Svenska Mästerskapet was the 22nd season of Svenska Mästerskapet, the football cup to determine the Swedish champions. Djurgårdens IF won the tournament by defeating AIK in the final with a 3–1 score.

Qualifying rounds

First qualifying round

|}

Second qualifying round

|-
|colspan=3 align=center|Replays

|}

Main tournament

Preliminary round

|-
|colspan=3 align=center|Replays

|}

Quarter-finals

|-
|colspan=3 align=center|Replays

|}

Semi-finals

|-
|colspan=3 align=center|Replays

|}

Final

References 

Print

http://eu-football.info/_tournament.php?id=3676

1917
Svenska
Mas
1917–18 in Swedish football